Amur Corrective Labor Camp (Amurlag) was a subdivision of GULAG which existed during 1947-1953 Its administration was headquartered in the settlement of Svobodny, Amur Oblast. Its main activities were coal mining,  gold mining, railroad construction, construction, and lumber works. Its headcount was up to over 3,000 (1951).

See also

Amurlag (1938—1941)

References

Camps of the Gulag
History of Amur Oblast
History of the Russian Far East
1947 establishments in the Soviet Union
Rail transport in the Soviet Union